Thomas Loosch (born 28 April 1963) is a Paralympian athlete from Germany competing mainly in category F38 throwing events.

Loosch has competed in two Paralympic Games and won medals in both.  In the 2004 Summer Paralympics in Athens he won a silver medal in the F38 shot put and a bronze medal in the F38 discus throw as well as competing in theF36/38 javelin.  In the 2008 Summer Paralympics in Beijing he competed in the F37/38 discus and won a bronze medal in the F37/38 shot put

External links
 

Paralympic athletes of Germany
Athletes (track and field) at the 2004 Summer Paralympics
Athletes (track and field) at the 2008 Summer Paralympics
Paralympic silver medalists for Germany
Paralympic bronze medalists for Germany
Living people
1963 births
Medalists at the 2004 Summer Paralympics
Medalists at the 2008 Summer Paralympics
Paralympic medalists in athletics (track and field)
German male discus throwers
German male shot putters